Hi-way, also known as Highway, is a 1975 single-player arcade racing game by Atari Inc. Marketed with the slogan “Hi Way — All It Needs Is Wheels,” it was Atari's first game to use a sit-down arcade cabinet.

Gameplay
This is a game where the player dodges cars on both sides of a narrow two-lane road. For every car successfully passed, one point is awarded. If the player hit a car on the road, the player loses all momentum and does not gain any points. Contrary to previous driving games where the player stood in front of the steering wheel, the player is seated. The game ends when time runs out.

Technology
The game hardware is a pre-microprocessor discrete transistor-transistor logic (TTL) design, and used the Durastress process. The cabinet was patented Oct. 20, 1975: (U.S. Patent # D243,626).

The game uses vertical scrolling, influenced by Taito's Speed Race (1974), which was released by Midway Manufacturing as Racer in North America. Hi-way is also the first racing video game to use a sit-down cabinet similar to older electro-mechanical games. The same cabinet design would be used the next year with Atari's popular driving game Night Driver (1976).

References

External links
 Cabinet version at Arcade flyers
 French upright version ('highway') at Arcade flyers
 Hi-Way at system16.com

1975 video games
Arcade video games
Arcade-only video games
Atari arcade games
Discrete video arcade games
Racing video games
Video games developed in the United States